Artyom Gareyev (born March 4, 1992) is a Russian professional ice hockey player of Tatar descent. He is currently playing with Admiral Vladivostok of the Kontinental Hockey League (KHL).

Gareyev made his Kontinental Hockey League (KHL) debut playing with Salavat Yulaev Ufa during the 2012–13 KHL season.

References

External links

1992 births
Tatar people of Russia
Volga Tatar people
Tatar sportspeople
Living people
Admiral Vladivostok players
Avtomobilist Yekaterinburg players
Metallurg Novokuznetsk players
Russian ice hockey forwards
Salavat Yulaev Ufa players
Severstal Cherepovets players
Sportspeople from Ufa